Walter Zagurski (January 12, 1911 – February 27, 1959) was a Lithuanian-born American weightlifter who competed in the 1932 Summer Olympics. In 1932 he finished sixth in the lightweight class. He was the founding editor of Strength & Health, and he was on the cover of its December 1932 issue. He was active in the York Barbell Club in York, Pennsylvania.

References

1911 births
1959 deaths
Lithuanian emigrants to the United States
People with acquired American citizenship
People associated with physical culture
People from York, Pennsylvania
American male weightlifters
Olympic weightlifters of the United States
Weightlifters at the 1932 Summer Olympics
American magazine editors